Priluzhny is a rural locality (a khutor) in Osadchevskoye Rural Settlement, Repyovsky District, Voronezh Oblast, Russia. The population was 195 as of 2010.

Geography 
Priluzhny is located 14 km north of Repyovka (the district's administrative centre) by road. Osadcheye is the nearest rural locality.

References 

Rural localities in Repyovsky District